True Blue is a jazz album by tenor saxophonist Tina Brooks recorded on June 25, 1960, and released on the Blue Note label. In the hard-bop idiom, it was Brooks' only performance as leader to be released during his lifetime, and features performances by Brooks, Freddie Hubbard, Duke Jordan, Sam Jones and Art Taylor.

Reception

Scott Yanow of Allmusic states: "the hard bop solos are consistently excellent" on True Blue.

Track listing
All compositions by Tina Brooks except those indicated.

Bonus tracks on CD reissue:

Personnel
Tina Brooks - tenor saxophone
Freddie Hubbard - trumpet
Duke Jordan - piano
Sam Jones - bass
Art Taylor - drums

Footnotes

1960 albums
Tina Brooks albums
Blue Note Records albums
Albums produced by Alfred Lion
Albums recorded at Van Gelder Studio